Faggot cells are cells normally found in the hypergranular form of acute promyelocytic leukemia (FAB - M3). These promyelocytes (not blast cells) have numerous Auer rods in the cytoplasm which gives the appearance of a bundle of sticks, from which the cells are given their name.

See also
 Buttock cell

References

Human cells
Pathology
Hematology
Acute myeloid leukemia